is a railway station located in the city of  Kitakami, Iwate Prefecture, Japan, operated by the East Japan Railway Company (JR East),

Lines
Yokokawame Station is served by the Kitakami Line, and is located 18.1 km from the terminus of the line at Kitakami Station.

Station layout
The station has one side platform serving a single bi-directional track. The station is unattended.

History
Yokokawame Station opened on November 18, 1921. The station was absorbed into the JR East network upon the privatization of the Japan National Railways (JNR) on April 1, 1987. A new station building was completed in 1991.

Surrounding area
 
Yokokawame Post Office
former Waga Town Hall

See also
 List of railway stations in Japan

References

External links

 

Railway stations in Iwate Prefecture
Kitakami Line
Railway stations in Japan opened in 1921
Kitakami, Iwate
Stations of East Japan Railway Company